Massachusetts Senate's 2nd Essex and Middlesex district in the United States is one of 40 legislative districts of the Massachusetts Senate. It covers 14.7% of Essex County and 3.9% of Middlesex County population in 2010. Democrat Barry Finegold of Andover has represented the district since 2019.

Towns represented
The district includes the following localities:
 Andover
 Dracut
 Lawrence
 Tewksbury

The current district geographic boundary overlaps with those of the Massachusetts House of Representatives' 14th Essex, 16th Essex, 17th Essex, 18th Essex, 19th Middlesex, and 36th Middlesex districts.

List of senators

See also
 List of Massachusetts Senate elections
 List of Massachusetts General Courts
 List of former districts of the Massachusetts Senate
 Other Essex County districts of the Massachusett Senate: 1st, 2nd, 3rd; 1st Essex and Middlesex
 Essex County districts of the Massachusetts House of Representatives: 1st, 2nd, 3rd, 4th, 5th, 6th, 7th, 8th, 9th, 10th, 11th, 12th, 13th, 14th, 15th, 16th, 17th, 18th
 Middlesex County districts of the Massachusetts House of Representatives: 1st, 2nd, 3rd, 4th, 5th, 6th, 7th, 8th, 9th, 10th, 11th, 12th, 13th, 14th, 15th, 16th, 17th, 18th, 19th, 20th, 21st, 22nd, 23rd, 24th, 25th, 26th, 27th, 28th, 29th, 30th, 31st, 32nd, 33rd, 34th, 35th, 36th, 37th

References

Further reading

External links
 Ballotpedia
  (State Senate district information based on U.S. Census Bureau's American Community Survey).

Senate
Government of Essex County, Massachusetts
Government of Middlesex County, Massachusetts
Massachusetts Senate